The Red Pyke River is a river in northern Fiordland, New Zealand. It is a tributary of the Pyke River, rising east of Telescope Hill and flowing southwards to join the Pyke River at Pyke Gorge, west of Red Mountain.

See also
List of rivers of New Zealand

References

Rivers of Fiordland